Ratsy (real name Patty Kemp; born in Jackson, Michigan) is a folk singer-songwriter who was part of the Boston folk scene. She is known for her quirky and humorous lyrics.

Biography
After attending Michigan State University and graduating from beauty school with a cosmetology license, she moved to Boston and sang in the subway. She performed in local coffeehouses and at colleges.

In 1999, she moved to Hollywood and began appearing in commercials while continuing her musical career. She took up with the lindy hop community, and took lessons in swing dancing. She appeared in a 2002 episode of Gilmore Girls, as a featured dancer during an episode focusing on a dance marathon. She has since relocated to Oberlin, Ohio, where she runs a vintage antique shop, Ratsy's Store.

Discography
 The Subway Songstress Years (1992)
 Squished Under a Train (1995)
 Flowery Swimsuit: The Live Album (2000)

References

External links
 Official website

American women singers
Songwriters from Michigan
American street performers
American folk musicians
Living people
Michigan State University alumni
Year of birth missing (living people)
People from Jackson, Michigan
People from Oberlin, Ohio
American women songwriters
Songwriters from Ohio
Singers from Michigan
21st-century American women